Ghana is traditionally a powerhouse of African Football but the sport is believed to be dying due to lack of corporate sponsorship.

Although popular amongst girls, many experience prejudice and discrimination.

Domestic football

After several years the Ghana FA implemented a Ghana Women's Football League. In 2022 the GWFL has finally gained television sponsorship.

Since 2016, the Ghana Women's FA Cup is played as the top knockout tournament of the Ghanaian association football.

National team

Ghana have qualified for 3 world cups.

Alberta Sackey and Adjoa Bayor are considered one of the best female players to come from Africa.

See also

Football in Ghana
Ghana women's national football team
List of Women football clubs in Ghana#Ghana (Women) Clubs

References